The NPL network, or NPL Data Communications Network, was a local area computer network operated by a team from the National Physical Laboratory in London that pioneered the concept of packet switching.

Based on designs first conceived by Donald Davies in 1965, development work began in 1968. Elements of the first version of the network, the Mark I, became operational during 1969 then fully operational in January 1970, and the Mark II version operated from 1973 until 1986. The NPL network and the ARPANET in the United States were the first two computer networks that implemented packet switching and the NPL network was the first to use high-speed links.

Origins
In 1965, Donald Davies, who was later appointed to head of the NPL Division of Computer Science, proposed a commercial national data network based on packet switching in Proposal for the Development of a National Communications Service for On-line Data Processing. After the proposal was not taken up nationally, during 1966 he headed a team which produced a design for a local network to serve the needs of NPL and prove the feasibility of packet switching. The design was the first to describe the concept of an "Interface computer", today known as a router.

The next year, a written version of the proposal entitled NPL Data Network was presented by Roger Scantlebury at the Symposium on Operating Systems Principles. It described how computers (nodes) used to transmit signals (packets) would be connected by electrical links to re-transmit the signals between and to the nodes, and interface computers would be used to link node networks to so-called time-sharing computers and other users. The interface computers would transmit multiplex signals between networks, and nodes would switch transmissions while connected to electrical circuitry functioning at a rate of processing amounting to mega-bits. In Scantlebury's report following the conference, he noted "It would appear that the ideas in the NPL paper at the moment are more advanced than any proposed in the USA".

Larry Roberts incorporated these concepts into the design for the ARPANET. The NPL network initially proposed a line speed of 768 kbit/s. Influenced by this, the planned line speed for ARPANET was upgraded from 2.4 kbit/s to 50 kbit/s and a similar packet format adopted.

Packet switching 

The first theoretical foundation of packet switching was the work of Paul Baran, in which data was transmitted in small chunks and routed independently by a method similar to store-and-forward techniques between intermediate networking nodes. Davies independently arrived at the same model in 1965 and named it packet switching. He chose the term "packet" after consulting with an NPL linguist because it was capable of being translated into languages other than English without compromise. Davies gave the first public presentation of packet switching on 5 August 1968.

Network development
The NPL team used their packet switching concept to produce an experimental network using a Honeywell 516 node. Coincidentally, this was the same computer chosen by the ARPANET to serve as Interface Message Processors. Construction began in 1968.

Elements of the first version of the network, Mark I NPL Network, became operational during 1969 then fully operational in January 1970. The local area NPL network and the wide area ARPANET in the United States were the first two computer networks that implemented packet switching. The network later used high-speed T1 links (1.544 Mbit/s line rate), the first computer network to do so. The Mark II version operated from 1973.

The NPL team also carried out simulation work on the performance of packet networks, including datagram networks.

The NPL network was later interconnected with other networks, including CYCLADES and the European Informatics Network (EIN) in 1976.

In 1976, 12 computers and 75 terminal devices were attached, and more were added. The network remained in operation until 1986, influencing other research in the UK and Europe.

Alongside Donald Davies, the NPL team included Derek Barber, Roger Scantlebury, Peter Wilkinson, Keith Bartlett, and Brian Aldous.

Protocol development 

One of the first uses of the term "protocol" in a data commutations context occurs in a memorandum entitled A Protocol for Use in the NPL Data Communications Network written by Roger Scantlebury and Keith Bartlett in April 1967. A further publication by Bartlett in 1968 introduced the concept of an "alternating bit protocol" (later used by the ARPANET and the EIN) and described the need for three levels of data transmission (roughly corresponding to the lower levels of the seven-layer OSI model that emerged a decade later). The Mark II version, which operated from 1973, used such a "layered" protocol architecture. The NPL team also introduced the idea of "protocol verification".

The NPL network was a testbed for internetworking research throughout the 1970s. Davies, Scantlebury and Barber were active members of the International Networking Working Group (INWG) formed in 1972. Vint Cerf and Bob Kahn acknowledged Davies and Scantlebury in their 1974 paper "A Protocol for Packet Network Intercommunication". Derek Barber was appointed director of the European COST 11 project played a leading part in proposing the European Informatics Network (EIN) and led the project while Scantlebury led the UK technical contribution. The EIN protocol helped to launch the INWG work, which proposed an "international end to end protocol" in 1975.

NPL research investigated the "basic dilemma" involved in internetworking; that is, a common host protocol would require restructuring existing networks if they were not designed to use the same protocol. NPL connected with the European Informatics Network by translating between two different host protocols while the NPL connection to the Post Office Experimental Packet Switched Service used a common host protocol in both networks. This work confirmed establishing a common host protocol would be more reliable and efficient.

Davies and Barber published "Communication networks for computers" in 1973 and "Computer networks and their protocols" in 1979. They spoke at the Data Communications Symposium in 1975 about the "battle for access standards" between datagrams and virtual circuits, with Barber saying the "lack of standard access interfaces for emerging public packet-switched communication networks is creating 'some kind of monster' for users". For a long period of time, the network engineering community was polarized over the implementation of competing protocol suites, commonly known as the Protocol Wars. It was unclear which type of protocol would result in the best and most robust computer networks.

Davies' research at NPL later focused on data security for computer networks.

Modern recognition 
NPL sponsors a gallery, opened in 2009, about the development of packet switching and "Technology of the Internet" at The National Museum of Computing at Bletchley Park.

See also
Coloured Book protocols
 History of the Internet
 Internet in the United Kingdom
 JANET
 UK Post Office Telecommunications and later British Telecommunications
Packet Switch Stream
International Packet Switched Service
 Telecommunications in the United Kingdom

References

Further reading

Primary sources

External links
NPL Data Communications Network NPL video, 1970s
Government loses way in computer networks New Scientist, 1975
How the Brits invented packet switching and made the internet possible Computing Weekly, 2010
The Story of Packet Switching Interview with Roger Scantlebury, Peter Wilkinson, Keith Bartlett, and Brian Aldous, 2011
The birth of the Internet in the UK Google video featuring Roger Scantlebury, Peter Wilkinson, Peter Kirstein and Vint Cerf, 2013

1967 establishments in England
Computer networking
Computer-related introductions in 1967
Experimental computer networks
History of computing in the United Kingdom
History of telecommunications in the United Kingdom
History of the Internet
National Physical Laboratory (United Kingdom)
Packets (information technology)
Telecommunications engineering